The Boy from Oz is an Australian jukebox musical based on the life of singer and songwriter Peter Allen, featuring songs written by him. The book commissioned for the musical is by Nick Enright, based on Stephen MacLean's 1996 biography of Allen.
Premiering in Australia in 1998 starring Todd McKenney, a revised version of the musical, written by Martin Sherman, opened on  Broadway in 2003, with Hugh Jackman in the title role.

At the ARIA Music Awards of 1998 the cast recording won the ARIA Award for Best Original Soundtrack, Cast or Show Album.

Plot (American Production)

Act I 
The musical begins with Australian performer Peter Allen recalling his life story, coming to terms with who he was ("The Lives of Me"). Afterwards, we go back to Allen's childhood in Tenterfield, Australia, where a young boy named Peter Woolnough is performing in local bars for money ("When I Get My Name in Lights"). Peter grows up and joins with Chris Bell to become the Allen Brothers, and they perform in Australian Bandstand ("Love Crazy"). After great success in Australia, the Allen Brothers perform in a Hong Kong Hilton hotel to Chinese businessmen. One evening, another person is watching them from the bar: the legendary Judy Garland. Peter convinces Judy to perform with them ("All I Wanted Was the Dream"), and Judy takes Peter to be the opening act in her concert in New York ("Only an Older Woman").

While in New York, Peter is introduced to Judy's daughter, Liza, and they fall in love ("Best That You Can Do"). There are rumors of Peter's homosexuality, and Judy warns Liza of this ("Don't Wish Too Hard"). Liza gives no attention to her warning and marries Peter ("Come Save Me").

Peter makes some mistakes, and at one of his all night parties, Liza walks in on him ("Continental American"), further fueling her suspicions that he is gay. Liza is working hard to get her career going ("She Loves to Hear the Music"), in contrast to Peter's excessive lifestyle. Judy dies, and Peter honors her ("Quiet Please, There's a Lady on Stage"). Liza's world comes crashing down as a result of her mother's death.

Liza confronts Peter on his alleged homosexuality, and their marriage ends ("I'd Rather Leave While I'm in Love"). Peter returns to Australia but realizes that he is not who people thought he was ("Not the Boy Next Door").

Act II 
Back in the US, Peter has gone solo and comes to terms with his bisexuality ("Bi-Coastal"). He meets the hardworking fashion model Gregory Connell. Greg does not want to be a part of Peter's life in show business, but he falls in love with Peter ("If You Were Wondering"). They soon get discovered by music producer Dee Anthony, and he gets them a gig at the Copacabana in New York ("Sure Thing Baby"). Peter's career takes off, and he wins an Oscar for "Arthur's Theme", in addition to recording songs that were covered by artists Olivia Newton-John and Frank Sinatra. Peter gives his best performance in the Radio City Music Hall with The Rockettes ("Everything Old is New Again"), and is surprised to know his mother is also in love.

Greg becomes stricken with AIDS, and even though Peter tries to help him carry on, he succumbs to his illness ("Love Don't Need a Reason"). Peter also becomes sick with AIDS, but Greg's spirit urges him to carry on ("I Honestly Love You"). Liza offers her support to Peter, and they both realize they had successful lives and careers without each other ("You and Me").

Peter returns to Australia and tries to tell his mother about his illness, but ultimately can't find a way to tell her. He then performs one last magnificent concert for Australia ("I Still Call Australia Home"), and witnesses a last flashback of his mother's love for him ("Don't Cry Out Loud"). Peter reflects on his life, realizing he has no regrets, before he ultimately succumbs to his disease ("Once Before I Go"), but not before going out in style with a farewell performance ("I Go to Rio"), joined by the entire cast as well.

Production history

Script
Stephen MacLean idolised Peter Allen, followed his career all over the world, interviewed him many times, and filmed his Australian solo cabaret debut. After Allen's death in 1992 MacLean started work on his biography of Allen, which was published in 1996, entitled  Peter Allen: The Boy from Oz, (alternative title The Boy from Oz: The Peter Allen Story).

While working on the biography, he suggested making Allen's life into a film to producer  Ben Gannon, having previously alerted Gannon to Allen's work back in the early 1970s. Gannon, however, thought that a documentary should come first, and produced The Boy from Oz, which was written and directed by MacLean. This screened on ABC Television in 1995.

After the biography was published in 1996, Gannon and Robert Fox decided to use the work as the basis for a stage musical. The book to be used for the show was commissioned from Nick Enright, and MacLean acted as consultant on workshopping the musical.

Original Australian production
The Boy from Oz had its world premiere, directed by Gale Edwards, at Her Majesty's Theatre, Sydney, Sydney, Australia, on 5 March 1998 and toured Brisbane, Melbourne, Adelaide and Perth, playing to over 1.2 million theatre patrons. It ran for a total 766 performances over two years. The production starred Todd McKenney as Peter Allen and Divinyls frontwoman Chrissy Amphlett as Judy Garland, Angela Toohey as Liza Minnelli and introduced Mathew Waters as Young Peter Allen.

Broadway
The Boy from Oz began previews on Broadway  at the Imperial Theatre on 16 September 2003 and opened on 16 October 2003. It closed on 12 September 2004, at the end of Hugh Jackman's contract. It was adapted for the American audience by playwright Martin Sherman, who removed some of the Australian terms (such as "jackaroo") and expanded the role of U.S. characters Garland and Minnelli. The musical played 32 previews and 365 performances. Directed by Philip William McKinley, with choreography by Joey McKneely, it starred Jackman as Peter Allen, Isabel Keating as Judy Garland, Stephanie J. Block as Liza Minnelli, Beth Fowler as Marion Woolnough, Jarrod Emick as Peter's lover Greg Connell, and John Hill as Mark Herron (Judy's husband). Jackman won the 2004 Tony Award for Best Leading Actor in a Musical and the Drama Desk Award for Outstanding Actor in a Musical, and Keating won the Drama Desk Award for Outstanding Featured Actress in a Musical. The show also received nominations for four other Tony Awards, including Best Musical.

Ben Brantley of The New York Times panned the show, calling it an "indisputably bogus show", but praised Jackman's performance. The musical recouped its investment of $8.25 million.

Australian arena tour
The Boy from Oz returned to Australia from 3 August 2006 to 10 September 2006 in a new production especially designed for the arena stage (audiences of over 10,000 people), called Boy from Oz Arena Spectacular.  Directed by Kenny Ortega, Hugh Jackman reprised his New York role as Peter Allen. He was joined by Australian actresses Chrissy Amphlett and Angela Toohey, reprising their roles as Judy Garland and Liza Minnelli. Shardyn Fahey-Leigh played the role of Young Peter Allen with Dylan Speedy. Rarmian Newton and Joshua Waiss Gates, both of whom later starred in Billy Elliot the Musical, were understudies in the Australian production. Peter's mother, Marion, was played by Colleen Hewett. The show had a support cast of 40 singer-dancers and a 25-piece orchestra.

The show also featured the vocals of Australian girls' high school choirs from Penrhos College when in Perth, and, while in Sydney, Melbourne, Adelaide and Brisbane, it featured the vocals of 100 girls from the Australian Girls Choir.

Melbourne revivals
In 2010 Todd McKenney returned to the title role with The Production Company in a version of the show that climaxed with a Peter Allen recording projected on the stage. In 2018 to celebrate The Boy from Oz turning 20, The Production Company staged a new production with anachronistic elements such as Aboriginal and rainbow flags. Rohan Browne starred as Peter Allen, with Caroline O’Connor as Judy Garland, Loren Hunter as Liza Minnelli, and Maxwell Simon as Greg Connell.

Perth Production
In 2021, Platinum Entertainment presented "The Boy From Oz" at Crown Theatre - one of the only venues in the world producing large scale theatre at the time. Directed and choreographed by Drew Anthony, and musically directed by Joe Louis Robinson, the show debuted Ethan Jones in the title role of Peter Allen alongside Lucy Williamson as Judy Garland, Elethea Sartorelli as Liza Minnelli, Casey Edwards as Marion Woolnough and Peter Cumins as Greg. 
An acknowledgement of country was presented by Jones as Peter Allen in the introduction to "I Still Call Australia Home".
The production included a full stage LED screen with integrated audio-visuals throughout, and concluded with a transition from Jones to the late Peter Allen singing, "Once Before I Go".

International productions
In Peru, the musical was released in May 2013, starring Marco Zunino as Allen, Érika Villalobos appeared as Liza Minnelli and Elena Romero as Judy Garland. It was the first Spanish language adaptation of this musical.

Song list (Original version) 
All songs written by Peter Allen except as noted

Act I

Act II

Song list (Broadway version)
All songs written by Peter Allen except as noted

Act I

Act II

Reception
In his review of the Broadway production for The New York Times, Ben Brantley wrote, "His limbs twirling like the blades of a windmill, Mr. Jackman channels the energy that was Allen with a rejuvenating life force all his own. And you don’t feel — as you so often do with such interpretations — that your memories of the prototype have been blurred. This is a performance that, against the odds, holds on to its integrity." However Brantley went on to write: "...this musical settles for a staleness and a hollowness that even Mr. Jackman's blazing presence can't disguise."

In his review for Variety of the Broadway production, Charles Isherwood praised Jackman but panned the show: "Jackman is giving a vital and engaging performance in this pitifully flimsy musical almost in spite of the material he’s been handed. It’s a sad waste of an exciting talent."

David Rooney, writing in Variety about the Australian arena tour, said, "When he first performed the role on Broadway in 2003, Hugh Jackman’s charisma, vitality and breezy confidence onstage far outshone the narrative or emotional scope of the by-the-numbers biomusical of singer-songwriter Peter Allen. The scales have been tipped even further toward the performer in this pumped-up reconfiguration of the show, playing state capitals in venues of 10,000 seats or more. It’s as much a concert platform for a returning local boy made good in Hollywood as it is a life story of Peter Allen. And that’s no bad thing."

In popular culture
Jackman's performance of "Once Before I Go" was featured in a montage dedicated to Alex Trebek in his final episode of Jeopardy, which aired on January 8, 2021, two months after Trebek's death from stage IV pancreatic cancer on November 8, 2020 at the age of 80.

Awards and nominations

Original Australian production

The original Australian production was also received six Melbourne Green Room Awards for 1999, including Outstanding Contribution by a Music Theatre Management.  It was also nominated for the Green Room Award for Best New Australian Play.

Original Broadway production

Notes

References

External links
April 2016 Production AFD Theatre, Arlington MA
2010 Production of The Boy From Oz Sydney
The Lives of Me - The Boy from Oz
Miranda Musical Society
CLOC Musical Theatre in May 2008
 Tamworth Musical Society November 2008
Review of CLOC Musical Theatre's Production on Theatrepeople
All About Hugh Jackman, Theatre Credits

1998 musicals
ARIA Award-winning albums
Australian musicals
Biographical musicals
Broadway musicals
Cultural depictions of Judy Garland
Cultural depictions of actors
Cultural depictions of Australian men
Helpmann Award-winning musicals
Jukebox musicals
LGBT-related musicals
Plays by Martin Sherman
Plays set in Australia
Plays set in New York City
Tony Award-winning musicals